Austin Smotherman (born May 19, 1994) is an American professional golfer. He played collegiate golf at Southern Methodist University and currently plays on the Korn Ferry Tour. He won the 2021 Simmons Bank Open.

Career
Smotherman, a college teammate of Bryson DeChambeau at SMU, turned pro in 2016. Playing on the PGA Tour Latinoamérica, he won the 2018 Mexican Open and finished fourth in the tour's Order of Merit, which guaranteed partial status on the Web.com Tour in 2019. In 2020, he held the 36-hole lead at the TPC San Antonio Championship before finishing solo fourth. Smotherman earned his first Korn Ferry Tour victory at the 2021 Simmons Bank Open, going wire-to-wire and winning by three strokes.

Professional wins (2)

Korn Ferry Tour wins (1)

PGA Tour Latinoamérica wins (1)

Results in The Players Championship

"T" indicates a tie for a place

See also
2021 Korn Ferry Tour Finals graduates

References

American male golfers
PGA Tour golfers
SMU Mustangs men's golfers
Golfers from California
People from Loomis, California
1994 births
Living people